The Yingbin Expressway is a  in the city of Shanghai, China. It is designated S1 for its entire length and serves as the main expressway from the city center to Pudong International Airport, Shanghai's main international airport. Before 2009, it was designated as A1.

Route
The Yingbin Expressway is located in Shanghai's Pudong New Area. It begins at the Outer Ring Yingbin Expressway Interchange, a four-way interchange with the Shanghai Outer Ring Expressway to the north and west and the S2 Shanghai–Luchaogang Expressway to the south. It travels eastward, paralleling much of the route of the Shanghai Maglev Train, which runs directly above the expressway. After an interchange with G1503 Shanghai Ring Expressway, it curves south and enters the Pudong International Airport lands. The expressway continues south, past the airport, as the Shanghai–Jiaxing–Huzhou Expressway. The portion through the airport lands itself that connects to the Shanghai–Jiaxing–Huzhou Expressway is not signed nor designated as S1 itself, but usually still referred to as the Yingbin Expressway.

Exit list

References

Expressways in Shanghai